Edward Young (1683–1765) was an English poet.

Edward Young may also refer to:

Business and industry
Edward Faitoute Condict Young (1835–1908), American banker
Edward Lewis Young (1862–1940), American banker
Edward Preston Young (1913–2003), British publisher, graphic designer and naval officer

Politics and law
Edward T. Young (1858–1940), American lawyer and politician
Edward James Young (1878–1966), Canadian politician
Hilton Young, 1st Baron Kennet (Edward Hilton Young, 1879–1960), British politician and writer
Edward Lunn Young (1920–2017), U.S. Representative from South Carolina

Religion
Edward Young (priest) (died 1705), English clergyman, Dean of Salisbury, father of the poet
Edward Young (bishop) (died 1772), English Anglican priest
Edward Joseph Young (1907–1968), American theologian

Others
Ned Young (ca. 1762–1800), British sailor, HMS Bounty mutineer
Edward B. Young (1835–1867), American Civil War sailor and Medal of Honor recipient
Edward Young (baseball) (1913–1967), American Negro leagues baseball player
Edward Young (courtier) (born 1966), Private Secretary to Queen Elizabeth II

See also
Ted Young (disambiguation)
Ed Young (disambiguation)